Stepan Andeeevich Zotov (November 23, 1882 – September 29, 1938) was a Soviet komkor (corps commander). He fought in the Russian Imperial Army in World War I before going over to the Bolsheviks in the subsequent civil war. He was a recipient of the Cross of St. George, the Order of the Red Banner and the Order of the Red Star. He was made a komkor on November 23, 1935. He died in a Moscow military hospital during a surgical operation.

Bibliography

Sources

Зотов Степан Андреевич на сайте города Калача-на-Дону

1882 births
1938 deaths
Russian military personnel of World War I
People of the Russian Civil War
Soviet komkors
Recipients of the Order of the Red Banner
Recipients of the Cross of St. George